Belgrade News is a newspaper in Belgrade, Montana, United States. It is a biweekly, published every Tuesday and Friday for free. Prior owner Pioneer News Group sold its papers to Adams Publishing Group in 2017. It provides local news on legislature, business, crime, municipal, and other areas.

References

External links
Official website

Newspapers published in Montana
News